Barenton-Cel is a commune in the department of Aisne in the Hauts-de-France region of northern France.

Geography
Barenton-Cel is located some 10 km north by northeast of Laon and 40 km southeast of Saint-Quentin. It can be accessed by the D547 road from Verneuil-sur-Serre in the northeast continuing southwest through the commune and the village to Aulnois-sous-Laon in the southwest. There is also the D545 road from Barenton-Bugny on the southeastern border. The commune consists entirely of farmland with no other villages or hamlets.

The Ru des Barentons stream forms the southeastern border of the commune and flows northeast to join the Souche river in the north.

Neighbouring communes and villages

Administration

List of Successive Mayors of Barenton-Cel

Population

Picture Gallery

See also
Communes of the Aisne department

References

External links
Barenton-Cel on the old IGN website 
Bell Towers website 
40000 Bell Towers website 
Barenton-Cel on Géoportail, National Geographic Institute (IGN) website 
Baranton Cel on the 1750 Cassini Map

Communes of Aisne